The arrondissement of Troyes is an arrondissement of France in the Aube department in the Grand Est region. It has 244 communes.

Composition

The communes of the arrondissement of Troyes, and their INSEE codes, are:

 Aix-Villemaur-Pâlis (10003)
 Allibaudières (10004)
 Arcis-sur-Aube (10006)
 Arrelles (10009)
 Assenay (10013)
 Assencières (10014)
 Aubeterre (10015)
 Auxon (10018)
 Avant-lès-Ramerupt (10021)
 Avirey-Lingey (10022)
 Avreuil (10024)
 Bagneux-la-Fosse (10025)
 Balnot-la-Grange (10028)
 Balnot-sur-Laignes (10029)
 Barberey-Saint-Sulpice (10030)
 Bar-sur-Seine (10034)
 Bercenay-en-Othe (10037)
 Bernon (10040)
 Bertignolles (10041)
 Bérulle (10042)
 Les Bordes-Aumont (10049)
 Bouilly (10051)
 Bouranton (10053)
 Bourguignons (10055)
 Bouy-Luxembourg (10056)
 Bragelogne-Beauvoir (10058)
 Bréviandes (10060)
 Brévonnes (10061)
 Briel-sur-Barse (10062)
 Brillecourt (10065)
 Bucey-en-Othe (10066)
 Buchères (10067)
 Buxeuil (10068)
 Buxières-sur-Arce (10069)
 Celles-sur-Ource (10070)
 Chacenay (10071)
 Chamoy (10074)
 Champigny-sur-Aube (10077)
 Channes (10079)
 Chaource (10080)
 La Chapelle-Saint-Luc (10081)
 Chappes (10083)
 Charmont-sous-Barbuise (10084)
 Chaserey (10087)
 Chaudrey (10091)
 Chauffour-lès-Bailly (10092)
 Le Chêne (10095)
 Chennegy (10096)
 Chervey (10097)
 Chesley (10098)
 Chessy-les-Prés (10099)
 Clérey (10100)
 Coclois (10101)
 Cormost (10104)
 Coursan-en-Othe (10107)
 Courtaoult (10108)
 Courtenot (10109)
 Courteranges (10110)
 Courteron (10111)
 Coussegrey (10112)
 Creney-près-Troyes (10115)
 Crésantignes (10116)
 Les Croûtes (10118)
 Cunfin (10119)
 Cussangy (10120)
 Dampierre (10121)
 Davrey (10122)
 Dierrey-Saint-Pierre (10125)
 Dommartin-le-Coq (10127)
 Dosches (10129)
 Dosnon (10130)
 Eaux-Puiseaux (10133)
 Éguilly-sous-Bois (10136)
 Ervy-le-Châtel (10140)
 Essoyes (10141)
 Estissac (10142)
 Étourvy (10143)
 Fays-la-Chapelle (10147)
 Feuges (10149)
 Fontette (10155)
 Fontvannes (10156)
 Fouchères (10158)
 Fralignes (10159)
 Fresnoy-le-Château (10162)
 Géraudot (10165)
 Grandville (10167)
 Les Granges (10168)
 Gyé-sur-Seine (10170)
 Herbisse (10172)
 Isle-Aubigny (10174)
 Isle-Aumont (10173)
 Javernant (10177)
 Jeugny (10179)
 Jully-sur-Sarce (10181)
 Lagesse (10185)
 Laines-aux-Bois (10186)
 Landreville (10187)
 Lantages (10188)
 Laubressel (10190)
 Lavau (10191)
 Lhuître (10195)
 Lignières (10196)
 Lirey (10198)
 Loches-sur-Ource (10199)
 La Loge-Pomblin (10201)
 Les Loges-Margueron (10202)
 Longeville-sur-Mogne (10204)
 Longsols (10206)
 Lusigny-sur-Barse (10209)
 Luyères (10210)
 Macey (10211)
 Machy (10212)
 Magnant (10213)
 Mailly-le-Camp (10216)
 Maisons-lès-Chaource (10218)
 Maraye-en-Othe (10222)
 Marolles-lès-Bailly (10226)
 Marolles-sous-Lignières (10227)
 Maupas (10229)
 Mergey (10230)
 Merrey-sur-Arce (10232)
 Mesnil-la-Comtesse (10235)
 Mesnil-Lettre (10236)
 Mesnil-Saint-Père (10238)
 Mesnil-Sellières (10239)
 Messon (10240)
 Metz-Robert (10241)
 Montaulin (10245)
 Montceaux-lès-Vaudes (10246)
 Montfey (10247)
 Montgueux (10248)
 Montiéramey (10249)
 Montigny-les-Monts (10251)
 Montreuil-sur-Barse (10255)
 Montsuzain (10256)
 Morembert (10257)
 Moussey (10260)
 Mussy-sur-Seine (10261)
 Neuville-sur-Seine (10262)
 Neuville-sur-Vanne (10263)
 Noé-les-Mallets (10264)
 Les Noës-près-Troyes (10265)
 Nogent-en-Othe (10266)
 Nogent-sur-Aube (10267)
 Nozay (10269)
 Onjon (10270)
 Ormes (10272)
 Ortillon (10273)
 Paisy-Cosdon (10276)
 Pargues (10278)
 Le Pavillon-Sainte-Julie (10281)
 Payns (10282)
 Piney (10287)
 Plaines-Saint-Lange (10288)
 Planty (10290)
 Poivres (10293)
 Poligny (10294)
 Polisot (10295)
 Polisy (10296)
 Pont-Sainte-Marie (10297)
 Pouan-les-Vallées (10299)
 Pougy (10300)
 Praslin (10302)
 Prugny (10307)
 Prusy (10309)
 Racines (10312)
 Ramerupt (10314)
 Les Riceys (10317)
 Rigny-le-Ferron (10319)
 La Rivière-de-Corps (10321)
 Roncenay (10324)
 Rosières-près-Troyes (10325)
 Rouilly-Sacey (10328)
 Rouilly-Saint-Loup (10329)
 Rumilly-lès-Vaudes (10331)
 Ruvigny (10332)
 Saint-André-les-Vergers (10333)
 Saint-Benoist-sur-Vanne (10335)
 Saint-Benoît-sur-Seine (10336)
 Sainte-Maure (10352)
 Sainte-Savine (10362)
 Saint-Étienne-sous-Barbuise (10338)
 Saint-Germain (10340)
 Saint-Jean-de-Bonneval (10342)
 Saint-Julien-les-Villas (10343)
 Saint-Léger-près-Troyes (10344)
 Saint-Lyé (10349)
 Saint-Mards-en-Othe (10350)
 Saint-Nabord-sur-Aube (10354)
 Saint-Parres-aux-Tertres (10357)
 Saint-Parres-lès-Vaudes (10358)
 Saint-Phal (10359)
 Saint-Pouange (10360)
 Saint-Remy-sous-Barbuise (10361)
 Saint-Thibault (10363)
 Saint-Usage (10364)
 Semoine (10369)
 Sommeval (10371)
 Souligny (10373)
 Thennelières (10375)
 Thieffrain (10376)
 Torcy-le-Grand (10379)
 Torcy-le-Petit (10380)
 Torvilliers (10381)
 Trouans (10386)
 Troyes (10387)
 Turgy (10388)
 Vailly (10391)
 Val-d'Auzon (10019)
 Vallières (10394)
 Vanlay (10395)
 Vauchassis (10396)
 Vaucogne (10398)
 Vaudes (10399)
 Vaupoisson (10400)
 La Vendue-Mignot (10402)
 Verpillières-sur-Ource (10404)
 Verricourt (10405)
 Verrières (10406)
 Villacerf (10409)
 Villechétif (10412)
 Villeloup (10414)
 Villemereuil (10416)
 Villemoiron-en-Othe (10417)
 Villemorien (10418)
 Villemoyenne (10419)
 Villeneuve-au-Chemin (10422)
 Villery (10425)
 Ville-sur-Arce (10427)
 Villette-sur-Aube (10429)
 Villiers-Herbisse (10430)
 Villiers-le-Bois (10431)
 Villiers-sous-Praslin (10432)
 Villy-en-Trodes (10433)
 Villy-le-Bois (10434)
 Villy-le-Maréchal (10435)
 Vinets (10436)
 Virey-sous-Bar (10437)
 Vitry-le-Croisé (10438)
 Viviers-sur-Artaut (10439)
 Vosnon (10441)
 Voué (10442)
 Vougrey (10443)
 Vulaines (10444)

History

The arrondissement of Troyes was created in 1800. At the January 2018 reorganization of the arrondissements of Aube, it lost four communes to the arrondissement of Bar-sur-Aube, and it gained one commune from the arrondissement of Nogent-sur-Seine.

As a result of the reorganisation of the cantons of France which came into effect in 2015, the borders of the cantons are no longer related to the borders of the arrondissements. The cantons of the arrondissement of Troyes were, as of January 2015:

 Aix-en-Othe
 Arcis-sur-Aube
 Bar-sur-Seine
 Bouilly
 Chaource
 La Chapelle-Saint-Luc
 Ervy-le-Châtel
 Essoyes
 Estissac
 Lusigny-sur-Barse
 Mussy-sur-Seine
 Piney
 Ramerupt
 Les Riceys
 Sainte-Savine
 Troyes-1
 Troyes-2
 Troyes-3
 Troyes-4
 Troyes-5
 Troyes-6
 Troyes-7

References

Troyes